Krzysztof Jurgiel (born 18 November 1953, in Ogrodniki) is a Polish politician. He is the former Minister of Agriculture and Rural Development in the cabinet of Beata Szydło (from 16 November 2015 to 2018).

He was elected to the Sejm on 25 September 2005, getting 42,920 votes in the 24th Białystok district, running on the Law and Justice list.

He was also a member of Sejm 1997–2001, Sejm 2001–2005, and Senate 2001–2005.

See also
Members of Polish Sejm 2005–2007

External links
Krzysztof Jurgiel - parliamentary page - includes declarations of interest, voting record, and transcripts of speeches.

1953 births
Living people
People from Knyszyn
Law and Justice politicians
Centre Agreement politicians
Agriculture ministers of Poland
Members of the Polish Sejm 1997–2001
Members of the Polish Sejm 2001–2005
Members of the Senate of Poland 2001–2005
Members of the Polish Sejm 2005–2007
Members of the Polish Sejm 2007–2011
Members of the Polish Sejm 2011–2015
MEPs for Poland 2019–2024
Mayors of Białystok